The Patagonian sierra finch (Phrygilus patagonicus) is a species of bird in the family Thraupidae.
It is found in Argentina and Chile.

Its natural habitats are temperate forests, subtropical or tropical dry shrubland, and temperate grassland.

Its diet consists mainly of seeds, flower parts, nectar, fruit, and insects, but it has also been seen to forage on human refuse.

References

External links

Patagonian sierra finch
Birds of the Southern Andes
Birds of Patagonia
Patagonian sierra finch
Patagonian sierra finch
Taxonomy articles created by Polbot